First Daze Here (The Vintage Collection) is the first of two compilation albums featuring 1970s material of doom metal band Pentagram. It was released by Relapse Records in 2001 and was followed by First Daze Here Too in 2006. It marked the first time that these early Pentagram recordings were officially released with worldwide distribution. The vinyl version came with a bonus 7", a replica of the 1972 Macabre single containing the songs "Be Forewarned" and "Lazylady". Many of the songs were re-recorded for Pentagram's 1980s and 1990s albums. The 2016 CD reissue of the compilation added a second disc – the previously vinyl-only Macabre single replica, this time in compact disc form.

Track listing
All tracks recorded March 22, 1973 at Bias Recording Studios unless noted.

Personnel
Pentagram
Bobby Liebling – vocals, additional guitar on "Lazylady" and "Be Forewarned"
Vincent McAllister – guitar
Greg Mayne – bass
Geof O'Keefe – drums
Randy Palmer – rhythm guitar on "Livin' in a Ram's Head" and "Earth Flight"
Marty Iverson – guitar on "Starlady"
Other
Cameron Davidson – photography

Pentagram (band) compilation albums
2001 compilation albums
Relapse Records compilation albums